Mṛtyu, is a Sanskrit word meaning death. Mṛtyu, or Death, is often personified as the deities Mara (मर) and Yama (यम) in Dharmic religions such as Hinduism and Buddhism.
 Mara (Hindu goddess), the goddess of death according to Hindu mythology.
Mṛtyu-māra as death in Buddhism or Māra, a "demon" of the Buddhist cosmology, the personification of Temptation.
Yama is the god of death and the underworld in Hinduism and Buddhism.
Yama in Hinduism.
Yama in Buddhism.

Etymology
The Vedic mṛtyú, along with Avestan mərəθiiu and Old Persian məršiyu comes from the Proto-Indo-Iranian word for death, *mr̥tyú-, which is ultimately derived from the Indo-European root *mer- ("to die") and thus is further related to Latin mors.

Literature

Vedas 
Mrtyu is invoked in the hymns of the Rigveda:

Upanishads 
The Brhadaranyaka Upanishad (a mystical appendix to the Shatapatha Brahmana and likely the oldest of the Upanishads) has a creation myth where  "Death" takes the shape of a horse, and includes an identification of the Ashvamedha horse sacrifice with the Sun:

Padma Purana 
Mrtyu fights in the war between the devas and the asuras in the legend of Jalandhara.

Mahabharata 
The Mahabharata references a legend regarding a dispute between Time, Mrityu, Yama, Ikshvaku, and a Brahmana. Mrityu is female in this legend.

See also
Yama
Yamaduta
Chitragupta

Notes and references

External links
SpokenSanskrit dictionary translation of Mrtyu

Sanskrit words and phrases
Hindu deities
Hindu mythology